New Prague High School is a public secondary school in New Prague, Minnesota, United States serving the communities of New Prague,  Lonsdale, and  Elko New Market.  The school has a ninety-eight percent or better graduation rate on average, and ninety percent of graduates attend a post-secondary institution.

History
The first high school classes in New Prague were held in a K–12 schoolhouse with the first high school class graduating in 1907. A separate high school building was constructed in 1924 at the corner of 1st Avenue NW and Main Street. An addition to that building opened in 1963, and a new high school opened across the street in 1976. The current high school building opened in 1999 at the corner of Columbus Ave. and 12th St. NE, onto which an addition was added in 2006.

Student athletes and fans of the school have been involved in a number of racist incidents during sporting events. Notable incidents include during a girl’s basketball game against Robbinsdale Cooper and a boys' hockey game against St. Louis Park. The latter event led to St. Louis Park refusing to play New Prague in any sport for the remainder of the 2021-22 school year.   The incident was investigated by an outside firm which could not substantiate the complaints after interviewing over 20 people and reviewing video of the game.

Academics
New Prague High School offers over one hundred courses in fourteen different areas of study.  There are a variety of required and elective classes for students to choose from. College in the Schools (CIS) and Advanced Placement (AP) classes are offered to the student body. Independent studies, mentorship, youth service, and extended day programs, are provided for students as well. Courses are delivered using a semester system with seven period school days.

Extracurricular activities

 Academic Challenge
 Archery Club
 Art Club
 High Mileage Club
 Band
 Choir
 Equestrian Club
 Fall Musical
 German Club
 National Honor Society
 Robotics Club
 One Act Play
 Scholastic Clay Target
 Spanish Club
 Speech Team Advisor
 Spring Play
 Student Council
 Trojan Times
 Yearbook Advisor
 Youth in Government

Athletics

GIRLS:
Fall:
Volleyball, Cheerleading, Tennis, Football
Cross Country, Soccer, Swimming/Diving
Winter:
Dance Team, Cheerleading, Basketball
Gymnastics, Wrestling, Nordic Skiing, Hockey
Spring:
Golf, Track and Field, Softball, Lacrosse

BOYS:
Fall:
Football, Soccer, Cross Country
Winter:
Basketball, Hockey, Nordic Skiing, Wrestling
Spring:
Tennis, Golf, Baseball, Track and Field, Lacrosse

Adaptive Softball and Floor Hockey are also offered.

Notable alumni
Laura Brod, member of the Minnesota House of Representatives (2003–2011).
Ron Johnson, former NBA player 
Robert Vanasek, former member (1973–1993) and Speaker (1987–1992) of the Minnesota House of Representatives

References

External links

Public high schools in Minnesota
Schools in Scott County, Minnesota
Schools in Le Sueur County, Minnesota
1999 establishments in Minnesota
Educational institutions established in 1999